These are the results for the girls' 63 kg event at the 2018 Summer Youth Olympics.

Results

References

 Results 

Weightlifting at the 2018 Summer Youth Olympics
2018 in women's weightlifting